V. N. Aditya (born Vadrevu Aditya) is an Indian film director and screenwriter known for his works in Telugu cinema.

Career
V.N.Aditya made his film debut with the 2001 family drama film Manasantha Nuvve starring Uday Kiran and Reemma Sen. The film ran for more than 200 days in many theatres across what was then the Andhra Pradesh.

V.N.Aditya went on to make Sreeram, a 2002 Tollywood film starring Uday Kiran, Anita Hassanandani & Ashish Vidyarthi. This was a remake of the Tamil film Dhill which starred Vikram, Laila Mehdin, Nassar and Vivek. His third film, Nenunnanu starring Nagarjuna Akkineni, Shriya Saran & Arthi Agarwal, was released in 2004 and became a stupendous hit. It was dubbed in Tamil as Chandramadhi and in Hindi as Vishwa ("The He Man").

Aditya's other films include Manasu Maata Vinadhu (2005) with Navdeep and Ankitha, Boss (2006) with Nagarjuna, Nayantara, and Poonam Bajwa, and Aata (2007) starring Siddharth Narayan and Ileana D'Cruz in the lead roles.

Filmography

References

External links
 

1972 births
Living people
Telugu film directors
Film directors from Andhra Pradesh
21st-century Indian film directors
People from East Godavari district